Roberto Mogrovejo (born 19 June 1972 in Buenos Aires) is a former Argentine football player that plays as a right winger. He was part of the Argentina squad in the 1991 World Youth Championship in Lisbon. He played for several Argentine teams including Argentinos Juniors and Defensa y Justicia. He also played abroad in Hapoel Kfar Saba of Israel and for Portuguese champions FC Porto for which he never made any official appearance.

External links
 Roberto Mogrovejo at BDFA.com.ar 

1972 births
Living people
Argentine footballers
Sportspeople from Bahía Blanca
Argentinos Juniors footballers
Deportivo Español footballers
Club Atlético Tigre footballers
Defensa y Justicia footballers
Primeira Liga players
FC Porto players
Hapoel Kfar Saba F.C. players
Argentine Primera División players
Argentine expatriate footballers
Expatriate footballers in Portugal
Expatriate footballers in Israel
Argentina youth international footballers
Argentina under-20 international footballers
Association football wingers